Barbodes umalii is a species of freshwater ray-finned fish from the carp and minnow family, Cyprinidae which is found in the Philippines where it has only been recorded from the Agus River system on Mindanao.

References

Barbodes
Freshwater fish of the Philippines
Endemic fauna of the Philippines
Fish described in 1968